Hadwen Carlton Fuller (August 28, 1895 – January 29, 1990) was a United States representative from New York.

Biography
He was born on August 28, 1895, in West Monroe, Oswego County, New York. He attended the public schools and Central Square High School. He worked as a bank clerk, and was assistant cashier of the First National Bank of Central Square from 1912 to 1918. During the First World War he served in the United States Army; in 1919 he organized the State Bank of Parish and served as a director. He was organizer of the Parish Oil Co. Inc. in 1926, serving as president since 1937, and was Chairman of the Oswego County Republican Committee in 1942.

Fuller was a member of the New York State Assembly (Oswego Co.) in 1943. He was elected as a Republican to the 78th United States Congress, to fill the vacancy caused by the death of Francis D. Culkin. He was re-elected to the 79th and 80th United States Congresses, holding office from November 2, 1943 to January 3, 1949. He was a delegate to the 1948 Republican National Convention. Afterwards he resumed his former business pursuits.

He died on January 29, 1990, in Parish, New York.

References

1895 births
1990 deaths
People from Oswego County, New York
American bankers
Republican Party members of the New York State Assembly
Republican Party members of the United States House of Representatives from New York (state)
20th-century American politicians